Thomas J. Bush (born March 16, 1948) is a politician and lawyer in the American state of Florida. He served in the Florida House of Representatives from 1978 to 1982, representing the 84th district.

References

1948 births
Living people
Members of the Florida House of Representatives